Elena Kaplinskaya (October 17, 1928, Moscow - January 3, 2014, Moscow), Russian writer, playwright, screenwriter, author of theatrical dramas, screenplays, short stories and novels, a member of the Russian Writers Union, the Union of Journalists of Russia and the Moscow Writers' Union.

Biography
Elena Kaplinskaya was born in Moscow in 1928 and studied at the Musical College of Gnesin. In 1955 she graduated from the scriptwriting faculty of the VGIK and married the Polish actor and film director Tsezary Kaplinsky.  She was a member of the Writers' Union from 1978 and from 1994 member of the Union of Journalists of Russia. Kaplinskaya trained as a scriptwriter and became the winner of many creative writing competitions including that of Belarusfilm, the competition for the Prize of Pogodin and the International Competition for the best woman's story in 1992.

Elena Kaplinskaya worked with prominent contemporary filmmakers such as Kostromenko, Titov, Brovkin and many others. Besides screenplays Kaplinskaya wrote theatrical plays, novels and short stories, and her articles were published in literary journals including the independent literary and political magazine "Friendship of Nations".

Elena Kaplinskaya's native city, Moscow, and the city played a central part in her stories. In her novel "A Moscow Story" the image of the city and its inhabitants are presented as the symbol of goodness and justice. The novel was born out of the complex changes in the social life in Moscow in the 1970s and early 1980s and became the subject of heated social and literary discussions. The novel was translated into French in 1984 and was published in Paris by Messidor Publishing.

The heroes of her other novel, "The Cinema of Moscow", belong to the first generation of post-war youth in Russia. The story also partly takes part in Hungary and describes the life of the Hungarian anti-fascists and documentary film director Ilona Kolonits. The play "The Best Loved" Kaplinskaya wrote in memory of all those who died in World War II  in Russia at the Battle of Kursk while defending the cities of Leningrad (now Saint-Petersburg) and Stalingrad (now Volgograd) . Kaplinskaya's film scripts were made into feature films by many film directors in Russia.

Filmography
 His 1991 holiday romance. Director: Gennady Dubrovin, Yuri Dmitrievich
 1988 A Dangerous Man (based on the story "boxes and boxes")
1979 The skin of a polar bear, Odessa Film Studio, USSR, 1979, col., 79 min. triller, film director: Vadim Kostromenko
1975, 142 min,  "Do not give up the queen" in 1975, 142 min, Drama, film director: Oleg Lentsius
1974 These are stories - a film-performance, drama, comedy. Director: Brovkin, Vyacheslav, Ishimbayevo, Lydia S.
1974 "The Meeting " 1st series
1974 "An Illusory Fact"  2nd series
1974 "Not at a Glance"  3 Series
1973 "The Engineer", TV drama,  theatrical production of the" Little Theatre", Creative Association "Screen", the Moscow Stanislavsky Drama Theater, theatrical directors: Vladimir Bailey and Viitaly Ivanov
1969, 'The Valse" drama, Director: Victor Titov
1967 "Next to you", drama. Director: Dubrovin, Yuri Nikolaevich
1962 "Little Dreamers"
1962 "A Mistake"
1961 "The Day, which marks 30 years" BelarusFilm, 89 min. romantical drama, film director: Valentin Vinogradov

Selected publications

Theatre plays
 "Spring orders" 1963
 "Gluhoman" 1965
 "Duty" 1964
 "A Pierce for Lovers" 1965
 "The Best Loved"

Short stories
 "Do not buy a cow, if you do not know how to milk her" 1992 - winner of the International Competition for the best woman's story in 1992, a collection of "What woman wants", Moscow, "Lenore", "Amrita" 1993
 "Boxes, little boxes" story 1988

Novels
 "A Moscow Story", novel,  Moscow, Profizdat 1983 and Messidor Publishing, Paris 1984
 "The Cinema of Moscow", a novel, Moscow, Profizdat 1991

References

Sources
 The magazine "Friendship of Peoples"
 http://kounb.kurganobl.ru/cgi-bin/irbis64r_13/cgiirbis_64.exe?

1928 births
2014 deaths
Russian-language writers
Russian women short story writers
Russian screenwriters
Women screenwriters
Russian dramatists and playwrights
Russian women dramatists and playwrights
20th-century Russian dramatists and playwrights
20th-century Russian women writers
Russian women novelists
Soviet writers
20th-century Russian short story writers